In architecture or structural engineering, a girt, also known as a sheeting rail, is a horizontal structural member in a framed wall. Girts provide lateral support to the wall panel, primarily, to resist wind loads.

A comparable element in roof construction is a purlin.

Stability in steel building construction
The girt is commonly used as a stabilizing element to the primary structure (e.g. column, post). Wall cladding fastened to the girt, or a discrete bracing system which includes the girt, can provide shear resistance, in the plane of the wall, along the length of the primary member. Since the girts are normally fastened to, or near, the exterior flange of a column, stability braces may be installed at a girt to resist rotation of the unsupported, inner flange of the primary member. The girt system must be competent and adequately stiff to provide the required stabilizing resistance in addition to its role as a wall panel support.

Girts are stabilized by (sag) rods/angles/straps and by the wall cladding. Stabilizing rods are discrete brace members to prevent rotation of an unsupported flange of the girt. Sheet metal wall panels are usually considered to provide lateral bracing to the connected, typically exterior flange along the length of the girt. Under restricted circumstances, sheet metal wall panels are also capable of providing rotational restraint to the girt section.

In general: Girt supports panel, panel stabilizes girt; Column supports girt, girt stabilizes column. The building designer should be knowledgeable in the complexities of this interactive design condition to ensure competent design of the complete structure.

An article of clothing: Reference to wearing a girt and having to bleach it often was made by British soldiers during World War II.

See also

 Girder

References

Construction
Structural system
Timber framing

de:Riegel (Bauteil)
pl:Rygiel